Andrew Robert Roddie (born 4 November 1971) is a Scottish former footballer, who played in the Scottish Premier Division for Aberdeen and Motherwell. Most recently, he was manager of Keith in the Highland League.

Career 
Born and brought up in Glasgow, Roddie joined Aberdeen as a 16-year-old and spent seven years at Pittodrie before signing for Motherwell in 1994 under the management of former teammate Alex McLeish. Failing to score in two and a half seasons at the Lanarkshire club, Roddie left for Notts County and began a peripatetic career which took in Sweden, Hong Kong, Northern Ireland and Iceland as well as further spells in Scotland and England. He finished his career in the Highland League with Inverurie Loco Works.

After retirement, Roddie became involved in youth football in the North East of Scotland founding Kintore United. He joined the coaching staff at Colony Park in August 2012 as co-manager before assuming sole responsibility in January 2014.

References

External links 

 

Scottish footballers
Scottish expatriate footballers
1971 births
Living people
Aberdeen F.C. players
Motherwell F.C. players
Knattspyrnufélag Reykjavíkur players
Yee Hope players
Peterhead F.C. players
Scottish expatriate sportspeople in Hong Kong
Elgin City F.C. players
Ljungskile SK players
Expatriate footballers in Iceland
Expatriate footballers in Hong Kong
Scottish expatriate sportspeople in Iceland
Footballers from Glasgow
Scotland under-21 international footballers
Notts County F.C. players
St Mirren F.C. players
Linfield F.C. players
Carlisle United F.C. players
Clydebank F.C. (1965) players
Stranraer F.C. players
Ross County F.C. players
Partick Thistle F.C. players
Arbroath F.C. players
Västerås SK Fotboll players
Inverurie Loco Works F.C. players
Scottish Football League players
Allsvenskan players
Association football midfielders
Scottish football managers
Scottish Junior Football Association managers
Huntly F.C. managers
Keith F.C. managers
Highland Football League managers